Liolaemus chungara is a species of lizard in the family  Liolaemidae. It is native to Chile.

References

chungara
Reptiles described in 2014
Reptiles of Chile
Endemic fauna of Chile
Taxa named by Andrés Sebastián Quinteros
Taxa named by Cristian Simón Abdala